Land of Enchantment may refer to:

 New Mexico, a state in the United States with the official nickname "Land of Enchantment"
 Land of Enchantment (album), a New Mexico-inspired country music album by Michael Martin Murphey